Petropedetes is a genus of frogs in the family Petropedetidae. In 2002, the genus absorbed all three species of the genus Arthroleptides, but they were moved back in 2014. The informally assigned common name for frogs in this genus (and for frogs in certain other genera) is torrent frogs.

The following species are recognised in the genus Petropedetes:
 Petropedetes cameronensis (Reichenow, 1874) 
 Petropedetes euskircheni (Barej et al., 2010)
 Petropedetes johnstoni (Boulenger, 1888)
 Petropedetes juliawurstnerae (Barej et al., 2010)
 Petropedetes newtonii (Bocage, 1895) – Barej et al. (2010) considers P. darwinii occurring in Bioko Island (Equatorial Guinea) a synonym of P. johnstoni.
 Petropedetes palmipes Boulenger, 1905
 Petropedetes parkeri (Amiet, 1983)
 Petropedetes perreti (Amiet, 1973)
 Petropedetes vulpiae (Barej et al., 2010)

References

 
Amphibian genera
Taxa named by Anton Reichenow
Taxonomy articles created by Polbot